Chiheb Ellili (born 1 December 1963) is a Tunisian football manager.

References

1963 births
Living people
Tunisian football managers
Océano Club de Kerkennah managers
ES Hammam-Sousse managers
ES Zarzis managers
US Monastir (football) managers
Stade Gabèsien managers
Dubai Club managers
Club Athlétique Bizertin managers
CS Sfaxien managers
Club Africain football managers
Al-Jazeera (Jordan) managers
Al-Faisaly SC managers
Étoile Sportive du Sahel managers
Tunisian Ligue Professionnelle 1 managers
Tunisian expatriate football managers
Expatriate football managers in the United Arab Emirates
Tunisian expatriate sportspeople in the United Arab Emirates
Expatriate football managers in Jordan
Tunisian expatriate sportspeople in Jordan
Expatriate football managers in Saudi Arabia
Tunisian expatriate sportspeople in Saudi Arabia